Jenni Jaakkola (b. 20 February 1999) is a Finnish singer-songwriter. She was the winner of the first series of KIDSing children's song contest on MTV3, Finnish television. Winning the final on 25 May 2013, Jaakkola received a recording contract with Antti Tuisku's label, Hyökyaalto ("Tsunami") Records. She also headlined a 2013 celebration tour.

Jaakkolan began recording her debut album in July 2013. Siipeni mun ("My Wings") was released on 11 October 2013.

In 2016 Jaakkola recorded The Guides and Scouts of Finland jamboree Roihu 2016 official camp song Roihu. In the autumn she made a cameo appearance on the Yle soap opera Uusi päivä ("A New Day"), recording a music video with the "made-for-tv" band Bangoland

Discography

Albums

Singles

Music videos 
 Tämä on unta (Dir. Samu Amunét)
 Minä ja siipeni mun (Dir. Joonas Laaksoharju)
 Roihu (Dir. Aapo Rainio)

References 

Finnish women singer-songwriters
1999 births
Living people
21st-century Finnish women singers